Accident Man: Hitman's Holiday (also known as Accident Man 2) is a 2022 action comedy film directed by Kirby Brothers and starring Scott Adkins (who also co-wrote the script with Stu Small), Ray Stevenson, Perry Benson and Sarah Chang.
It is the sequel to Jesse V. Johnson's 2018 film Accident Man. The film was shot in Valletta, Malta. The film was released on October 14, 2022, in US and October 24, 2022, in UK.

Premise 
Mike Fallon also known as The Accident Man,  relucantly accepts to protect Mrs. Zuzzer, a crime boss to protect her ungrateful son Dante from top assassins in the world after he is blackmailed by Mrs. Zuzzer to do the job in exchange for his best friend Finicky Fred's life.

Cast 
 Scott Adkins as Mike Fallon / The Accident Man
 Ray Stevenson as Big Ray, Mike's maniacal father figure and mentor from the first film
 Perry Benson as Finicky Fred, Mike's colleague from the first film who specializes in unorthodox weapons
 Sarah Chang as Wong Siu-Ling, a descendant of Kung-Fu master Wong Fei-Hung who ultimately becomes Mike's sidekick
 George Fouracres as Dante Zuzzer
 Flaminia Cinque as Mrs. Zuzzer
 Beau Fowler as Poco The Killer Clown, a highly durable killer clown who carries a giant hammer as his main weapon and was believed by many to be an urban legend
 Faisal Muhammed as Yendi / The Vampire, an assassin from Ghana who enjoys consuming blood
 Andreas Nguyen as Oyumi, an assassin with Japanese origins whose fighting style is based on Ninjutsu and an old acquaintance of Mike
 Peter Lee Thomas as Silas / San Francisco's Strangler, an assassin who prefers to strangle his victims to death and an old acquaintance of Mike
 Zara Phythian as Freya du Preeze/ The Angel of Death, a highly skilled assassin claimed to have been trained in the dark arts by those who viewed James Bond as a "muppet" and an old acquaintance of Mike

Production 
Filming began in November 2021 in Malta, although the Covid-19 pandemic prevented it.

Reception

References

External links 
 

2022 films
2022 action thriller films
2022 action comedy films
2020s American films
2020s British films
2020s English-language films
American action thriller films
American action comedy films
British action thriller films
British action comedy films
Destination Films films
Films based on British comics
Films based on comics
Films shot in Malta
Live-action films based on comics

fa:مرد حادثه‌آفرین: تعطیلات آدم‌کش
de:Accident Man: Hitman's Holiday
ms:Accident Man 2
ko:Accident Man: Hitman's Holiday
zh:意外殺手變保鑣
cy:Accident Man 2
hi:एक्सीडेंट मैन 2
arz:رجل الحادث ۲
ar:رجل الحادث ۲
uk:Нещасний випадок 2
bg:Чернова:Човекът катастрофа
fr:Accident Man: Hitman's Holiday
hu:Accident Man: Hitman’s Holiday
tr:Accident Man: Hitman’s Holiday
cs:Accident Man 2: Zabijákova dovolená
el:Accident Man 2